Michael Costello (born June 1936, London) is a former British communist activist.

Costello was born into a family of communist activists, as the son of Bella Lerner and Paddy Costello.  Paddy left the Communist Party of Great Britain (CPGB) in 1939, but Bella remained a member her entire life.  Late in World War II, Mick's parents moved to work with the New Zealand diplomatic mission in Moscow, and Mick was educated at a state school in the city, where he became fluent in Russian.

The family returned to Britain when Mick was fourteen, and he studied at the University of Manchester, becoming President of the Students' Union.  He joined the CPGB in 1956, becoming known as an expert on economics and a journalist on the Morning Star, a daily newspaper associated with the party.  He wrote two books expounding party views: The Communist View, published in 1969, and Workers' Participation in the Soviet Union, which came out in 1977.

In 1979, Costello was elected as the CPGB's National Industrial Organiser, building links with trade unions and becoming what the New Statesman later described as "certainly the best-known communist in Britain, probably the cleverest, and easily the party's best linguist".  In this role, it was suggested in several newspapers that he was working as a spy for the Soviet Union, possibly even following his father's footsteps; a charge which Costello denies, and Francis Beckett notes that his role would not be good cover for a spy, and would be unlikely to enable him to discover important secrets.

Costello took part in a major debate in 1982 with Martin Jacques, editor of Marxism Today, who had criticised the shop stewards' movement.  Concerned about the party's direction, Costello left his post to become full-time industrial correspondent of the Morning Star, serving in the role through the UK miners' strike.

Costello resigned from the CPGB in the mid-1980s, and started the Costello Trading Consultancy, making deals in Russia in fields from oil to fast food and artificial limbs.  He also set up an exchange scheme for Russian police and those in the Metropolitan Police.  Later in life, he returned to theoretical work, and in 2008, he joined the Communist Party of Britain.

References

1936 births
Living people
Alumni of the University of Manchester
Communist Party of Britain members
Communist Party of Great Britain members